is a 1955 black-and-white Japanese romantic comedy, the second film directed by Kinuyo Tanaka.

Plot
Setsuko and her older sister Ayako live in their father's house in Nara. Ayako's aunt, who is worried about Ayako's marriage prospects as she grows older, tries to set Ayako up with a bank manager's son. Setsuko is determined not to see her sister enter into an unhappy marriage, and sets about trying to spark a love interest between Ayako and Amamiya, a visiting friend from Ayako's past. Setsuko bounces her ideas off of Yasui, a family friend, and enlists his help, ultimately aiming to get Ayako and Amamiya to go for a moonlit walk together.

Cast
 Chishu Ryu as Mokichi Asai
 Shûji Sano as Shunsuke Takasu
 Hisako Yamane as Chizuru
 Yoko Sugi as Ayako
 Mie Kitahara as Setsuko
 Shōji Yasui as Yasui
 Ko Mishima as Amamiya
 Kinuyo Tanaka as Yoneya

Notes 
This was Shōji Yasui's debut film, and he took his stage name from his character in this film.

The Moon Has Risen was adapted from a script written by Kinuyo Tanaka's long-time collaborator and mentor, Yasujirō Ozu. The film bears many oft-noted resemblances to Ozu's cinematic style.

References

External links

1955 films
1955 romantic comedy films
Japanese black-and-white films
Films directed by Kinuyo Tanaka
1950s Japanese-language films
Japanese romance films
Japanese romantic comedy films
1950s Japanese films